The 1932 Tour de France was the 26th edition of the Tour de France, one of cycling's Grand Tours. The Tour began in Paris with a flat stage on 6 July, and Stage 12 occurred on 22 July with a mountainous stage from Gap. The race finished in Paris on 31 July.

Stage 12
22 July 1932 - Gap to Grenoble,

Stage 13
23 July 1932 - Grenoble to Aix-les-Bains,

Stage 14
24 July 1932 - Aix-les-Bains to Evian,

Stage 15
25 July 1932 - Evian to Belfort,

Stage 16
26 July 1932 - Belfort to Strasbourg,

Stage 17
27 July 1932 - Strasbourg to Metz,

Stage 18
28 July 1932 - Metz to Charleville,

Stage 19
29 July 1932 - Charleville to Malo-les-Bains,

Stage 20
30 July 1932 - Malo-les-Bains to Amiens,

Stage 21
31 July 1932 - Amiens to Paris,

References

1932 Tour de France
Tour de France stages